Dostoyevskaya may refer to:
 Dostoyevskaya (Saint Petersburg Metro)
 Dostoevskaya (Moscow Metro)

People with the surname
 Anna Dostoevskaya, the second wife of writer Fyodor Dostoyevsky
 Lyubov Dostoevskaya, second daughter of Fyodor Dostoyevsky and Anna Snitkina

See also
 Dostoevsky (surname)